RMG Connect was the relationship marketing division of J. Walter Thompson, developing solutions both online and offline in direct marketing, interactive marketing and sales promotion.

As of December 2009, RMG Connect had more than 900 employees in 22 countries and 32 offices. The CEO of RMG Connect Worldwide was Philip Greenfield. He and North American President Mark Miller were terminated in March 2009 as new Worldwide Director for Digital at JWT and RMG, David Eastman, began his reorganization.

Awards 
In January 2006, RMG Connect was named #7 on Adweek's annual list of the top 50 Interactive Agencies.

Services 
Strategy - Customer relationship management consulting
Direct marketing - acquisition, cross-selling, up-selling, telemarketing, response advertising, niche marketing, loyalty marketing
Data & Analytics - data generation, data management, segmentation & profiling, modelling, targeting, list broking
Digital marketing - website, extranet, intranet, e-CRM, advertising, e-mail, viral, multimedia
Promotions -  brand, trade, retail, point of sale

Offices
Europe, Middle East and Africa
Throughout Europe, the Middle East and Africa, RMG Connect's offices can be found in Athens, Brussels, Cape Town, CasablancaDublin, [[Frankfurt am Cape TownMain]], Dubai, London, Madrid, Milan, Paris, Prague, Stuttgart, Vienna, and Zürich.

North America
RMG Connect's North American offices are located in Atlanta, Dallas, Miami, Minneapolis, New York City, Toronto and Vancouver.

South America
RMG Connect's Latin American officers are in Curitiba and São Paulo.

Asia-Pacific
In the Asia Pacific region, RMG Connect can be located in Hong Kong, Beijing, Bangalore, Chennai, Gurgaon, Mumbai, Singapore, Sydney and Tokyo.

External links
Official Website
Digital Influencer
Influencer Marketing

WPP plc
Advertising agencies of the United States
Companies based in New York City